The Garden Gurus is an Australian lifestyle gardening television series that has aired on the Nine Network since 2 February 2002, and also distributed internationally across 86 countries.

Nine Network original programming
Australian non-fiction television series
2002 Australian television series debuts
2010s Australian television series
Television shows set in Perth, Western Australia